The 2004 Pilot Pen Tennis was a women's tennis tournament played on outdoor hard courts. It was the 22nd edition of the Pilot Pen Tennis and was part of the Tier II Series of the 2004 WTA Tour. It took place at the Cullman-Heyman Tennis Center in New Haven, United States, from August 22 through August 28, 2004. Seventh-seeded Elena Bovina won the singles title and earned $93,000 first-prize money.

Finals

Singles

  Elena Bovina defeated  Nathalie Dechy 6–2, 2–6, 7–5

Doubles

  Nadia Petrova /  Meghann Shaughnessy defeated  Martina Navratilova /  Lisa Raymond 6–1, 1–6, 7–6(7–4)

References

External links
 ITF tournament edition details
 Tournament draws

Pilot Pen Tennis
2004
Pilot Pen Tennis
Pilot Pen Tennis
Pilot Pen Tennis
Pilot Pen Tennis
2004 Pilot Pen Tennis